Michael Smith (born 10 May 1976) is a New Zealand rugby union and rugby league footballer who played in the 1990s and 2000s. He played representative level rugby union (RU) for North Harbour. and representative level rugby league (RL) for New Zealand, and at club level for Canterbury Bulldogs, Castleford Tigers (Heritage № 750) (twice), Hull FC, York, Hull Kingston Rovers, Swinton Lions and Te Atatu Roosters.

References

External links
In-form Smith wins Kiwi call-up
Bulldogs profile
Saints Heritage Society profile
Statistics at thecastlefordtigers.co.uk

1976 births
Living people
Canterbury-Bankstown Bulldogs players
Castleford Tigers players
Hull F.C. players
Hull Kingston Rovers players
New Zealand national rugby league team players
New Zealand rugby league players
New Zealand rugby union players
North Harbour rugby union players
Rugby league props
Rugby league second-rows
Swinton Lions players
Te Atatu Roosters players
York Wasps players